is a Japanese animation studio established in May 1979 by Yuji Nunokawa, previously an animator and director for Tatsunoko Production. Its headquarters are located in Mitaka, Tokyo. Pierrot is renowned for several worldwide popular anime series, such as Naruto, Bleach, Yu Yu Hakusho, Black Clover, Boruto: Naruto Next Generations, Tokyo Ghoul, Ghost Stories, Great Teacher Onizuka and Saiyuki.

The company's logo is the face of a clown. "Piero" is a Japanese loanword for clown, adopted from the classical character of Pierrot.

Yu Yu Hakusho and Saiyuki, two of the company's anime series, won the Animage Anime Grand Prix Award in 1994 and 1995, and 2000, respectively.

Productions

TV series

1980s

1990s

2000s

2010s

2020s

Anime films

OVAs and specials
Note: This may not be a complete list.
 Dallos (December 16, 1983–August 5, 1984) — 4 episodes
 Cosmo Police Justy (July 20, 1985)
 Creamy Mami, the Magic Angel: Eien no Once More (1984)
 Creamy Mami, the Magic Angel: Lovely Serenade (1985)
 Creamy Mami, the Magic Angel: Long Goodbye (1985)
 Kimagure Orange Road: Shonen Jump Special (November 23, 1985) — Short film
 Fire Tripper (December 16, 1985)
 Creamy Mami, the Magic Angel Song Special 2: Curtain Call (1986)
 Maris the Chojo (May 21, 1986)
 Magical Emi, the Magic Star: Finale! Finale! (1986)
 Bari Bari Densetsu (May 10, 1986 – December 16, 1986) — 2 episodes
 Magical Emi, the Magic Star: Semishigure (1986)
 Laughing Target (March 21, 1987)
 Lily C.A.T. (September 1, 1987)
 Persia, the Magic Fairy: Merry-go-Round (1987)
 Salamander (February 25, 1988 – February 21, 1989) — 3 episodes
 Harbor Light Story Fashion Lala Yori (March 11, 1988)
 Baoh (November 1, 1989)
 Gosenzo-sama Banbanzai! (August 5, 1989 – January 25, 1990) — 6 episodes
 Like the Clouds, Like the Wind (March 21, 1990) — Television film
  (June 16, 1991) — Television film
 The Abashiri Family (May 21, 1991–November 21, 1991) — 4 episodes
 The Heroic Legend of Arslan (August 17, 1991–September 21, 1995, episodes 3–4, co-animated with Daume) — 6 episodes
 Here Is Greenwood (November 22, 1991–March 26, 1993) — 6 episodes
 Eternal Filena (December 21, 1992–February 25, 1993) — 6 episodes
 Kyō Kara Ore Wa!! (April 1, 1993–December 21, 1996) — 10 episodes
 Yu Yu Hakusho: Eizo Hakusho (September 21, 1994–February 7, 1996) — 6 episodes
 Plastic Little: The Adventures of Captain Tita (March 21, 1994)
 Key the Metal Idol (December 16, 1994 – August 7, 1996) — 13 episodes
 Street Fighter II: Return to the Fujiwara Capital (March 29, 1995) (animation)
 Sonic the Hedgehog (1996)
 My Dear Marie (1996) — 3 episodes
 Hunter x Hunter Pilot (1998)
 Tokimeki Memorial: Forever With You (1999) — 2 episodes
 Tenamonya Voyagers (1999) — 4 episodes
 Fushigi Yuugi: Eikouden (2001–2002) — 4 episodes
 Hikaru no Go Special, Match of Justice! The Ancient Flower Blooms!! (2002)
 Gensoumaden Saiyuuki: Kibou no Zaika (2002)
 I"s (2002–2003) — 2 episodes
 I"s Pure (2002–2003, with ARMS) — 6 episodes
 Hikaru no Go: Memories (2004)
 Bleach: Memories in the Rain (2004)
 Gakkou no Kaidan (2005–2009) — 10 episodes
 Naruto: Finally a Clash!! Jounin vs. Genin! (2005)
 Bleach: The Sealed Sword Frenzy (2006)
 Saiyuki Reload: Burial (2007–2008) — 3 episodes
 Tamala 2010: A Punk Cat in Space (2007)
 Naruto x UT (2011)
 Yona of the Dawn (2015) — 3 episodes
 Tokyo Ghoul [JACK](2015)
 Tokyo Ghoul [PINTO](2015)
 The Day Naruto Became Hokage (2016)
 Road of Naruto (2022)

ONAs

Video games
Note: This may not be a complete list.

Outsourced Western animation

Notes

References

External links

 

 
Japanese animation studios
Mass media companies established in 1979
Japanese companies established in 1979
Mitaka, Tokyo
Animation studios in Tokyo